Sphingomyelin phosphodiesterase 3 is an enzyme that in humans is encoded by the SMPD3 gene.

References

Further reading